Josée Dupuis is a Canadian  biostatistician. She is a professor in the Boston University School of Public Health, where she chairs the department of biostatistics. Her research interests include genome-wide association studies, gene–environment interaction, and applications to diabetes and cardiovascular disease.

Education and career
She did her undergraduate studies at Concordia University. She earned her Ph.D. in 1994 at Stanford University. Her dissertation, Statistical Problems Associated with Mapping Complex and Quantitative Traits from Genomic Mismatch Scanning Data, was supervised by David Siegmund.

She worked in the biotech industry and as a faculty member at Northwestern University before joining Boston University School of Public Health.

Recognition
Dupuis became a fellow of the American Statistical Association in 2013, for "outstanding contributions to the development and application of statistical methods for genetics data; for excellence of collaborative research in mapping human complex disease genes; and for significant service to the profession, particularly at the interface of statistics with genetic epidemiology and medicine", and a fellow of the American Association for the Advancement of Science in 2014, for "distinguished contributions to the field of statistical genetics". In 2015, she was elected president of the International Genetic Epidemiology Society for the 2016 term.

References

External links

Living people
American statisticians
Canadian statisticians
Women statisticians
Biostatisticians
Concordia University alumni
Stanford University alumni
Northwestern University faculty
Boston University faculty
Fellows of the American Statistical Association
Fellows of the American Association for the Advancement of Science
Year of birth missing (living people)